Henry Deringer, Sr. was an American gunsmith originally based in Richmond, Virginia in the late 18th century and early 19th century.  He was the father and mentor of Henry Deringer Jr, whose name is now synonymous with small basic pistols known as derringers.  (A misspelling of the family name that continues to this day).

He was born in Germany and moved to America before the Revolutionary War. The name Deringer stems from the High German "Thüringer," which means "native of Thuringia," a Federal Land of central Germany.  Deringer's workshop produced several types of the highly regarded Kentucky rifles and Kentucky pistols using the flintlock action.

The family moved to Philadelphia in 1806, where Deringer continued to develop the rifle, notably narrowing the stock, adding a more crescent shaped butt-plate, and decorating with more inlay work than on previous models.  He supplied an army version of these weapons to the government under contract.  Deringer's son joined as an apprentice in the early 19th century, and produced the famous small pistol in 1825.

Deringer died December 28, 1833 and is buried in the Easton German Reformed Graveyard in Northampton, Pennsylvania.

References 

Firearm designers
Gunsmiths
1756 births
1833 deaths
People from Thuringia
People from Easton, Pennsylvania
German emigrants to the Thirteen Colonies
Burials in Pennsylvania